James Walker (born 21 January 1949) is a Canadian rower. He competed in the men's coxed four event at the 1972 Summer Olympics.

References

1949 births
Living people
Canadian male rowers
Olympic rowers of Canada
Rowers at the 1972 Summer Olympics
Rowers from Hamilton, Ontario
Pan American Games medalists in rowing
Pan American Games bronze medalists for Canada
Rowers at the 1971 Pan American Games